Marie-France Garaud (born 3 March 1934) is a French politician.

She was a private advisor for President Pompidou and Jacques Chirac during his first time as Prime Minister. In the 1970s, she was considered to be the most influential woman of France. She ran in the 1981 French presidential election and sat at the European parliament from 1999 to 2004, elected on the list of Charles Pasqua and Philippe de Villiers.

She voted "no" in the French Maastricht Treaty referendum and in the 2005 French European Constitution referendum.

Books

References

1934 births
Living people
Rally for the Republic MEPs
People from Poitiers
Candidates in the 1981 French presidential election